The Epitome margaritae eloquentiae in Leeds Special Collections is the only surviving copy of a book on rhetoric written in Latin by Lorenzo Guglielmo Traversagni (c.1425-1503). The author used the pen name Guillermus Saphoensis in this work.

Traversagni was a Franciscan friar and humanist scholar from Savona, Northern Italy. Considered to have been the first humanist professor of rhetoric at the University of Cambridge, Traversagni wrote the Margaritae eloquentiae as a guide to rhetoric and the art of preaching. The original book was published in 1478 under the full title of Rhetorica nova, sive, Margarita eloquentiae castigate ad eloquendum divina accommodata, (The new rhetoric, or, The pearl of purified eloquence, adapted to the expression of matters divine).

The Epitome margaritae eloquentiae is a short summary of Rhetorica nova and was finished during Traversagni's stay in Paris in 1480. It was only ever published in England by William Caxton probably in the same year. Traversagni is known to have visited England twice in the 1470s and may have paid Caxton to print the book. Traversagni could then sell copies to his pupils.  In the Epitome Traversagni argues that preaching is a rhetorical skill which aims to promote Christian virtue.  At Cambridge Traversagni had lectured on Aristotle's Ethics and also the Rhetorica ad Herennium attributed to Cicero.  He uses these philosophers' concepts of demonstrative logic to prove his point.

Physical Description 
The copy of the Epitome in Leeds Special Collections is printed on Italian paper of the kind made in Fabriano and Genoa in the medieval period and has watermarks of the scissors type.  The binding is 20th century limp vellum with a smooth spine.

The 'Epitome is printed in Caxton's type 2* with 29 long lines to a full page.  The signatures are [a6 b4 c6 d6 e8 f4].  There are no printed signatures, catchwords or pagination.

Provenance 

The Epitome was formerly part of a volume which belonged to Anthony Higgin who was Dean of Ripon from 1608 to 1624.  The rest of the volume is in the British Library.  In 1960 the Epitome was bought for the Brotherton Collection.

Feature 

There is a handwritten annotation on the verso of the final leaf of the book and the recto of an inserted leaf.  This is in black ink and comprises a ballad with text and music A lytyll ballet mayde of ye yong dukes grace about Henry FitzRoy, Duke of Richmond and Somerset.

References 

Rhetoric
Incunabula
Ballads
15th-century books